The Museum of East Asian Art (Museum für Ostasiatische Kunst Köln) opened in Cologne, Germany in 1913 and is the oldest of its kind in the country. The collection of Chinese, Korean, and Japanese art originates in that of its founders Adolf Fischer (de) (1856–1914) and his wife Frieda (de) (1874–1945). The new building by architect Kunio Maekawa, pupil of Le Corbusier, opened in 1977.

See also

 List of museums in Cologne
 Museum of Asian Art

References

External links
 Museum of East Asian Art

Museums in Cologne
Asian art museums in Germany
Museums established in 1913
1913 establishments in Germany